Donald E. C. Bull  was a rugby union player who represented Australia.

Bull, a centre, claimed 1 international rugby cap for Australia.

References

Australian rugby union players
Australia international rugby union players
Rugby union centres